The 3rd Arabian Gulf Cup was the third edition of the Arabian Gulf Cup. The tournament was held in Kuwait City, Kuwait and was won by two-time defending champions and hosts Kuwait. The tournament took place between 15 and 29 March 1974. All matches were played at the Al Kuwait Sports Club Stadium.

Oman took part in the competition for the first time. Kuwait defeated Saudi Arabia 4–0 in the final to win their third title in a row. This victory meant that Kuwait had earned the privilege of keeping the trophy permanently.

The number of teams was increased from five to six and the format of the competition was changed. Instead of one round-robin group, the six nations would be split into two groups of three. The top two from each group qualify for the semi-finals with each group winner facing the other group's runner-up. The winners of each semi-final would face each other in the final while the losers would play in the third-place play-off.

Teams

Venues

Match officials

Preliminary round

First round
All times are local, AST (UTC+3).

Group A

Group B

Knockout stage
All times are local, AST (UTC+3).

Semi-finals

Third place play-off

Final

Winners

Statistics

Goalscorers

Awards
Player of the Tournament
 Mohammed Ghanim

Top Scorer
 Jasem Yaqoub (6 goals)

Goalkeeper of the Tournament
 Ahmed Al-Tarabulsi

References

External links 
 Official Site (Arabic)

1974
1974
1974 in Asian football
1973–74 in Saudi Arabian football
1973–74 in Emirati football
1973–74 in Kuwaiti football
1973–74 in Qatari football
1973–74 in Bahraini football
1974 in Oman